Yevhen Yevseyev (16 April 1987 – 19 August 2011) was a professional Ukrainian football defender who played for Arsenal Kyiv in the Ukrainian Premier League. He was killed in a car accident in Ivano-Frankivsk Oblast on 19 August 2011.

External links
 Profile of Yevhen Yevseyev
 Official Website Profile
 Yevhen Yevseyev

1987 births
2011 deaths
Association football defenders
FC Arsenal Kyiv players
Footballers from Kyiv
Road incident deaths in Ukraine
Ukrainian footballers